Anton Pogue (born 20 June 1976) is an American snowboarder who specialised in slalom and parallel giant slalom. He was born in Sunnyvale, California.

References

1968 births
American male snowboarders
Living people
Sportspeople from Sunnyvale, California